Jhajia is a village in Odisha, India, with a population of about 20,000.

Education 
The village has an UP School and a High School. And most kids in the village attend school at least till the primary levels. After the primary level the drop out rate is pretty high. The village has devised a very innovative way to fund its own schools where the proceedings from the fish cultivation at the village pond goes to fund the development of schools.
The Jhajia High School has made quite a name of its own in the area because of its results year after year it has been delivering more than 10 first division students. A rarity in this area. After school most of the students who are interested in pursuing further education leave for bigger towns like Cuttack, Banki, Athgarh and Bhubaneswar. Some also attend nearby colleges located at Baramba and Sankhameri.

Festivals 

Jhajia is very famous for the celebration of a local festival called Danda Utsava. The main attraction during the Danda Utsava is the award winning dramatic team of Danduas who perform various mythological stories in plays. The elements of comedy and audience involvement as in a street play is what makes the Danda nacha so popular.

Food and water 

Being a village of extremely hard working farmers, the village does not face any scarcity of food. It is famous for Badam and vegetables. The variety of vegetables grown by these farmers and consumed fresh contributes to the better health of the villagers in comparison to the villages around the area. But the main problem here is the scarcity of water in the summer. Jhajia is located on a tabletop hill, and hence during the summer when the water table recedes the villagers have a hard time finding drinking water. Gada chua & Nanda Chua, which are perhaps the best drinking water sources in the area, dries out quickly and are often not sufficient to fulfill the cooking and drinking needs of the whole village.

References

External links 

Villages in Cuttack district